St-y-Nyll railway station, also known as St-y-Nyll Platform railway station or St-y-Nyll Halt railway station, served the village of St. Brides-super-Ely, Vale of Glamorgan, Wales, in 1905 on the Barry Docks Railway.

History
The station was opened on 1 May 1905 by the Barry Railway. It was a very short-lived station, being open for six months before closing on 20 November 1905.

References

Disused railway stations in Cardiff
Railway stations in Great Britain opened in 1905
Railway stations in Great Britain closed in 1905
1905 establishments in Wales
1900s disestablishments in Wales
Former Barry Railway stations